Robert Elbert Cooper Jr. (born January 19, 1957) is an American  lawyer who served as Attorney General of the state of Tennessee. A Democrat, Cooper Jr. was appointed by the state supreme court to that position and was sworn in as the 26th Attorney General and Reporter of Tennessee by Tennessee Supreme Court Chief Justice William M. Barker, taking office on November 1, 2006. The Court declined to reappoint him on September 15, 2014, naming Herbert Slatery as his successor.  His tenure ended on October 1, 2014.

His father, Robert E. Cooper Sr., served on the Tennessee Supreme Court from 1974 until 1990.

Background and education

Cooper is a native of Chattanooga, Tennessee. He graduated from the Baylor School in 1975.

Cooper graduated magna cum laude with an A.B. in economics from Princeton University in 1979 after completing a 75-page long senior thesis titled "Wealth Neutrality and the Funding of Education in New Jersey". While a student at Princeton, Cooper was the chairman of The Daily Princetonian. He then received a J.D. from Yale Law School, where he was managing editor of the Yale Law Journal. Between college and law school, he worked as a reporter for The Raleigh (NC) Times.

Career

Before being nominated to the position of Attorney General, Cooper was Legal Counsel to Governor Phil Bredesen from 2003 to 2006. In addition to providing legal advice to the Governor, he coordinated the legal affairs of the executive branch for the Governor, assisted in the development and implementation of legislation, advised on judicial appointments, and reviewed requests for executive clemency and extradition.

Prior to his appointment as Legal Counsel to Governor Bredesen, Cooper was an attorney and partner of the law firm, Bass, Berry & Sims, PLC based in Nashville where he dealt in corporate, constitutional and regulatory litigation. Before being a partner at the law firm, he worked as a clerk for U.S. District Judge Louis F. Oberdorfer in Washington, D.C. He also worked as an adjunct professor at Vanderbilt University Law School.

References
Notes

Sources
 Tennessee Attorney General website

External links
 Biography

1957 births
Living people
People from Chattanooga, Tennessee
Princeton University alumni
Yale Law School alumni
Tennessee Attorneys General